The Institute of Zoology (IoZ) is the research division of the Zoological Society of London (ZSL) in England. It is a government-funded research institute specialising in scientific issues relevant to the conservation of animal species and their habitats. The Institute is based alongside London Zoo at ZSL's Regent's Park site in the City of Westminster.

The Institute has around 25 full-time research staff, plus postdoctoral research assistants, technicians and Ph.D. students. The Institute is supported by the Higher Education Funding Council for England in partnership with the University of Cambridge, and receives additional research funding from UK research councils (NERC, BBSRC, ESRC) and research charities (the Wellcome Trust and the Leverhulme Trust). Research covers many fundamental aspects of biological sciences which have relevance to the conservation of animal species and their habitats.

The Institute offers research training through Ph.D. studentships, and hosts Undergraduate and Masters level research projects conducted as part of its own M.Sc. courses and courses at other institutions. Undergraduate projects are available at London Zoo and Whipsnade Zoo.

See also
Living Planet Index
Red List Index
Regional Red List
EDGE of Existence Programme
EDGE Species

References

External links
Institute of Zoology Website
Zoological Society of London Website

Biological research institutes in the United Kingdom
Government research
Research institutes in London
Zoology organizations
Zoological Society of London